This is a list of Commissions of Inquiry established in South Africa since the end of Apartheid. A Commission of Inquiry, or more formally a Judicial Commission of Inquiry, is a public inquiry which has been established by either the President of South Africa or a Premier of one of the nine provinces of South Africa. Inquiries are generally established under two pieces of legislation, either the Commissions Act, 1947, or the Constitution of the Republic of South Africa, although they have also been established under other legislation too, such as the Promotion of National Unity and Reconciliation Act and the National Prosecuting Authority Act etc.  

Section 4 of the Commissions Act, 1947 states "All the evidence and addresses heard by a commission shall be heard in public...". Section 3(3) of the act states "If required to do so by the chairman of a commission a witness shall, before giving evidence, take an oath or make an affirmation, which oath or affirmation shall be administered by the chairman of the commission or such official of the commission as the chairman may designate". No person appearing before the Commission may refuse to answer any question on any grounds other than those contemplated in section 3(4) of the Commissions Act, 1947.

The Constitution of the Republic of South Africa states:
The President is responsible for appointing commissions of inquiry - Section 84(2)(f)
The Premier of a province is responsible for appointing commissions of inquiry - Section 74(5)(a)
A province may investigate, or appoint a commission of inquiry into, any complaints of police inefficiency or a breakdown in relations between the police and any community; and must make recommendations to the Cabinet member responsible for policing - Section 206(5)

See also
List of Committees of the Parliament of South Africa

References

South Africa
Commissions of Inquiry in South Africa